Ragnhild Gløersen Haga (born 12 February 1991) is a Norwegian olympic champion cross-country skier.

Career
Haga competed in the 2015 World Cup season, making a breakthrough by taking 12 top-ten World Cup results.

At the 2015 Tour de Ski, she finished fourth overall.

She represented Norway at the FIS Nordic World Ski Championships 2015 in Falun.

In May, 2021, she was dropped from the Norwegian National Cross-country Team.

Personal life
 
Haga was born in Nannestad on 12 February 1991. 
 
She is the niece of Anders Bakken, who competed in cross-country skiing at the 1980 Winter Olympics in Lake Placid. Her partner is Øyvind Gløersen.

Cross-country skiing results
All results are sourced from the International Ski Federation (FIS).

Olympic Games
 2 medals – (2 gold)

World Championships

World Cup

Season standings

Individual podiums
 2 victories – (1, 1 ) 
 11 podiums – (7 , 4 )

Team podiums
 2 victories – (2 ) 
 3 podiums – (3 )

References

External links
 
 
 
 

1991 births
Living people
Norwegian female cross-country skiers
Tour de Ski skiers
Cross-country skiers at the 2018 Winter Olympics
Cross-country skiers at the 2022 Winter Olympics
Olympic cross-country skiers of Norway
Medalists at the 2018 Winter Olympics
Olympic medalists in cross-country skiing
Olympic gold medalists for Norway